Marian Marianovich Peretyatkovich (23 August 1872, in Usychi (Усичі in Ukrainian), Volhyn (now Ukraine)  22 May 1916, in Kyiv (Ukraine) was a Russian and Ukrainian architect. His premature death at the age of 43 limited his career to only eight years of independent practice (1908-1916), however, he managed to excel in a rational (Finnish) variety of late Art Nouveau, Renaissance Revival and Russian Revival in Saint Petersburg and Moscow. 
He is sometimes compared with Louis Sullivan on account of his insistence on functionality of office buildings.

Biography

Training

Peretyatkovich trained at Saint Petersburg Institute of Civil Engineers, graduating in 1901, and the Imperial Academy of Arts under Leon Benois (1901-1906). Still at college, Peretyatkovich became famous as a refined draftsman; architect like Gavriil Baranovsky, Roman Klein and Ivan Rerberg hired him for drafting and interior designs. Thus, Peretyatkovich was involved in such high-profile jobs as the Hotel Metropol, Elisseeff Emporium, and the Pushkin Museum. Before graduation, Peretyatkovich secured a solid reputation among professionals in both capitals of Russia.

In 1907, he travelled over Europe on the Academy study tour, and learned the Finnish version of Art Nouveau practiced by Eliel Saarinen and Lars Sonck, as well as Roman architecture of Southern Europe; both these styles became the trademarks of his short career.

Own practice

On his return from Europe, Peretyatkovich designed his first major project - Solodovnikov's Cheap Apartment Building in Moscow (it was executed by Traugott Bardt), a typical Northern Moderne, Saint Petersburg version of Art Nouveau. His second project - the Northern Insurance Buildings in Moscow, was executed in collaboration with Ivan Rerberg and Vyacheslav Oltarzhevsky in stern Neoclassical Revival. This buildings are also notable as Ilya Golosov's first employment and for Sergei Rachmaninoff melody written for the chiming clock. Now, they  house the Constitutional Court of Russia.

In Saint Petersburg, Peretyatkovich designed various office and residential buildings; the best known, Wawelberg Trade Bank (1911-1912), combines neoclassical composition with Renaissance exterior (in the same period, Ivan Zholtovsky built a similar but far smaller Tarasov House in Moscow).

The historicist dimension of Peretiatkovich's work is even more pronounced in his designs for St Petersburg churches. He oversaw the construction of the Saviour Church "on Waters" (Спас-на-Водах), inspired by the 12th-century architecture of Vladimir-Suzdal and commemorating Russian sailors who perished during the Russo-Japanese War. The church was demolished by the Leningrad authorities in 1932. His other major project was the Roman Catholic church of Notre-Dame de Lourdes (1908–09), inspired by Romanesque architecture of Northern Europe and designed in collaboration with Leon Benois.

His last work was a memorial chapel for the late Prince Oleg Konstantinovich of Russia, modelled after historical Pskov churches.

Legacy
Peretyatkovich, as the youngest member of Neoclassical Revival movement after 1915, had a solid influence on Saint Petersburg architects of his period, securing the leading role of this style together with Vladimir Shchuko and Ivan Fomin.

His early reputation as a talented graphic artist in college and a very short architectural career that left a lasting influence are reminiscent of another architect, Konstantin Melnikov.

Completed buildings

Saint Petersburg

1907-1908 Interiors, State Council Hall, 6 Isaakievskaya Square (with Leon Benois)
1907-1909 Notre Dame de France church, 7 Kovensky Lane
1908 Bridge over Fontanka (with Leon Benois)
1908-1909 Salamandra apartment building, 4 Gorokhovaya Street
1910-1911 Saviour on the Waters church (destroyed)
1911-1912 Wawelberg Trading Bank and apartments, 7-9 Nevsky Prospect
1912-1913 Catholic orphanage, 19 Kirillovskaya Street
1912-1913 City services building, 49 Kronverksky Prospect
1912-1914 Russian Trade and Industry Bank, 15 Bolshaya Morskaya Street
1914-1915 Ministry for Trade and Industry, 8 Makarova Embankment

Moscow

1899-1900 Assistant to Roman Klein on Pushkin Museum
1898-1907 Assistant to Gavriil Baranovsky on Elisseeff Store, 14 Tverskaya Street
1901-1903 Assistant to Hotel Metropol (Moscow) architects
1965-1908 Solodovnikov Cheap Apartment Building, 65 Gilyarovskogo Street
1909-1918 Northern Insurance Society, 23 Ilyinka Street (with Ivan Rerberg, Vyacheslav Oltarzhevsky)
1915-1916 Prince Oleg Konstantinovich of Russia memorial chapel, Ostashevo, Volokolamsk District

Rostov-on-Don

1910s State Bank building

References

William Craft Brumfield, Commerce in Russian Urban Culture 1861-1914, The Woodrow Wilson Center Press, 
William Craft Brumfield, The Origins of Modernism in Russian Architecture, University of California Press, 1991 contents
Russian: Нащокина, Мария, "Архитекторы московского модерна", М, "Жираф", 2005, стр.373-377  (Maria Naschokina)

Russian architects
Russian people of Ukrainian descent
Ukrainian architects
1872 births
1916 deaths
Russian neoclassical architects
Art Nouveau architects
Saint-Petersburg State University of Architecture and Civil Engineering alumni